Hippie Sabotage are an electronic dance music duo from Sacramento, California, consisted of brothers Kevin and Jeff Saurer. They are well known for their remix of "Habits (Stay High)", which has surpassed 1 billion views on YouTube.

History 
The brothers began working on music at the age of 12, focusing on hip-hop and creating beats for local artists such as Yukmouth. The name Hippie Sabotage was inspired by their fathers' initials H.S. They initially started in the indie genre in 2005 and gradually entered the electronica genre. They continued to venture into creating hip-hop musical beats for Chicago artists like Alex Wiley and C Plus. They progressed into making electronic music, appearing at several music festivals such as Lollapalooza, Bonnaroo Music Festival and Electric Zoo. 

Hippie Sabotage released their own material in 2013 with their EP Vacants followed by The Sunny Album in 2014. Ellie Goulding posted the remix "Habits (Stay High)" with the brothers and Swedish singer Tove Lo, which resulted in world-wide attention, hitting number one that year on Billboards Next Big Sound chart. They later released their third EP Providence in 2016 followed by their EP Options. That year, the brothers refused to exit the stage and assaulted a security guard after experiencing technical difficulties at What the Festival in Portland, Oregon. In 2018, they hit one-billion streams and announced their national tour, Legends of Fall.

Discography

Albums
 The Sunny Album (2014)
 Providence (2016)
 Vibes (2016)
 Drifter (2017)
 Red Moon Rising (2020)
 Overdrive (2020)
 Floating Palace (2021)

Extended plays
 Vacants (2013)
 Johnny Long Chord (2014)
 Devil Eyes (2016)
 Options (2016)
 ''Hentai (2018) with Azizi Gibson

References

External links
 Official website

Club DJs
Living people
American musical duos
Musical groups from Sacramento, California
Musical groups established in 2005
2005 establishments in the United States
Year of birth missing (living people)